Hamilton Webber was an Australian composer best known for his long association with Cinesound Productions.

He also worked extensively in the theatre.
The songs he wrote for the Fuller brothers' pantomime Mother Goose were praised by Harry Jacobs, among others.

References

External links

Australian male composers
Australian composers
Year of birth missing
Year of death missing